Nike Art Gallery is an art gallery in Lagos and Osun state owned by Nike Davies-Okundaye. The gallery is one of the largest of its kind in West Africa, it boasts a collection of about 8,000 diverse artworks from various Nigerian artists like Chief Josephine Oboh Macleod. The Lagos gallery is in a five-storey tall building

References

External links 

Cultural venues in Lagos
Art museums and galleries in Lagos